The 1964 Purdue Boilermakers football team was an American football team that represented Purdue University during the 1964 Big Ten Conference football season. In their ninth season under head coach Jack Mollenkopf, the Boilermakers compiled a 6–3 record, finished in third place in the Big Ten Conference with a 5–2 record against conference opponents, and outscored all opponents by a combined total of 168 to 146.

The team's statistical leaders included quarterback Bob Griese with 934 passing yards, running back Gordon Teter with 614 rushing yards, offensive end Bob Hadrick with 441 receiving yards, and fullback Randy Minniear with 54 points scored. 

Defensive end Harold Wells was selected by the Associated Press (AP) as a first-team player on the 1964 All-America team. Six Purdue players were selected by either the AP or United Press International (UPI) for their 1964 All-Big Ten Conference football teams: Harold Wells (AP-1, UPI-1); defensive tackle Jim Garcia (AP-1, UPI-1); Bob Hadrick (UPI-1); center Ed Flanagan (UPI-2); offensive tackle Karl Singer (UPI-2); and defensive tackle Jerry Shay (UPI-2).

Schedule

Roster
 QB Bob Griese, So.

Game summaries

Iowa
 Gordon Teter 29 rushes, 132 yards

Indiana
 Gordon Teter 31 rushes, 126 yards

References

Purdue
Purdue Boilermakers football seasons
Purdue Boilermakers football